SR8 may refer to:
 Radical SR8
 Radical Sportscars
 Small nucleolar RNA sR8

See also
 List of highways numbered 8